U.S. Army Major Dale Richard Buis (August 29, 1921 – July 8, 1959) was the second American casualty of the Vietnam War killed at the hands of the Vietcong. He is the first name listed on the Vietnam Veterans Memorial.

Life and career
Buis was born and raised in Pender, Nebraska, the son of Dr. John Buis, a physician, and his wife Serena (née Kundsen). He graduated from Wentworth Military Academy in Lexington, Missouri. He was part of the Military Assistance Advisory Group (MAAG) sent in 1955 to train South Vietnam troops. 

The Viet Cong attacked the mess hall where he and four other officers were watching the movie The Tattered Dress.  M/Sgt Ovnand, who was in charge of the projector, switched on the lights to change to the next reel, when VC guerrillas poked their weapons through the windows and sprayed the room with automatic weapons fire. M/Sgt Ovnand was hit with several 9mm rounds. He immediately switched the lights off and headed to the top of the stairs, where he was able to turn on the exterior flood lights. He died from his wounds on the stairs. Major Buis, at that time, was crawling towards the kitchen doors. When the exterior flood lights came on, he must have seen an attacker coming through the kitchen doors. He got up and rushed towards attacker, but was only able to cover  before being fatally hit from behind. His actions startled the attacker who was about to throw his satchel charge through the door. The attacker's satchel charge had already been activated and his moment of hesitation allowed the satchel charge to explode, killing him. Two South Vietnamese guards that were on duty that night were also killed by the Viet Cong. The wounded included Captain Howard Boston (MAAG 7) and the Vietnamese cook's eight-year-old son.

Major Buis was buried in Fort Rosecrans National Cemetery in San Diego.

See also
Richard B. Fitzgibbon, Jr.
Harry Griffith Cramer Jr.
Chester M. Ovnand

Further reading
"Death at Intermission Time", Time, July 20, 1959.
"First on the Wall", M/Sgt Ray Bows, U.S. Army Retired, 2012

1921 births
1959 deaths
Wentworth Military Academy and College alumni
United States Army officers
People from Pender, Nebraska
Military personnel from Nebraska
1959 in Vietnam
American military personnel killed in the Vietnam War
Burials at Fort Rosecrans National Cemetery
United States Army personnel of the Vietnam War